DATEV is a registered cooperative society (i.e. "eG") that is primarily a technical information services provider for tax, accountant and attorneys. While it initially emerged as a data center service provider, it now provides software directly to end users (e.g. businesses) and consulting services for these occupations. The co-operative's focus is on the tax market.

History 

DATEV was founded on 14 February 1966, by 65 tax agents in the Nuremberg area to provide accounting services to its clients with the help of a computer. Its original name was DATEV Data Processing Organization for Tax Agents and Related Tax Services Providers within the Federal Republic of Germany, a registered co-operative society with limited liability ("Datenverarbeitung und Dienstleistung für den steuerberatenden Beruf"). The initiators were Heinz Sebiger, the 1997 honorary citizen of Nuremberg, and Joachim Mattheus.

The organisation was established to apply new applications of IT to accounting practices, because of an existing workforce shortage and the imminent introduction in 1968 of VAT. The initial DATEV services were to be completely data center based. All data was to be entered into data collection devices held "on-site" at each accountant's office which would then be sent as a tape by mail to the data center or "Registry" where they were processed and duly returned by mail to each respective accountant's office as processed tax return reports.

The initial data center services were provided by IBM until DATEV established its own center in 1969.  In 1974, DATEV offered its members a data by dial up service to replace the mail delivery of data on tape to the Registry. The resulting returns and reports (e.g. payrolls, accounting reports, taxes or stocks) continued to be delivered to members via post. In 1984 work commenced on creating software to allow end client data to be processed directly "in-house" (i.e. "on-site" in each members office) in preference to being processed at the data center "Registry". The first "in-house" software applications were made available to members in 1989.

The initial "in-house" software was based on the IBM operating system known as OS/2. In 1998 the "in-house" software was made available to its members on Microsoft Windows, as it was clear that the OS/2 operating system was going to be phased out.

In 1998, DATEV also began to focus on delivering more "in-house" business software services, consulting and training based on the increased demand by members. The rapid increase in PC performance and availability of high quality (laser) printers (in duplex A4/A3) on site made the "in-house" processing of end client data both faster and more flexible than data center processing.

Legal 
The organisation is a registered cooperative. Membership is only open to members of the tax, accountancy and legal professions.

Business 

In 1998 CEO Dieter Kempf led an initiative to add a second leg to its business by entering the legal services market. DATEV's takeover of the Hamburg-based company "MCT" brought the software "Phantasy" in its product portfolio. After a professionally and "politically" difficult start-up phase in the then crowded legal services market DATEV now offers "Software for lawyers" that are in the top five of their league including RA-MICRO, AnNoText, ReNoStar / ReNoFlex. The addition of legal services to DATEV's portfolio is still controversial given that lawyers and tax professionals are increasingly offering the same services in some areas and therefore becoming increasingly competitive to one another.

DATEV first attempts to deliver "services for lawyers" meant finding qualified legal partners with the required legal and IT backgrounds. Soon after the successful establishment of the legal services market, the DATEV product range was extended again with the offer of "audit" software for accountants.

A new development is DATEV's DATEVnet which provides business with Managed Security Services. A law firm's communication equipment (ISDN / DSL) can be connected to the DATEV data center via an exclusive dial-in VPN tunnel. DATEVnet users are then routed through a central security zone to DATEV over the Internet. The security zone includes a range of staggered and redundant protection systems, such as antivirus or firewall systems that are constantly monitored and updated by security specialists. The multi-level security system also offers a highly responsive level of data protection in an environment that is constantly assaulted new forms of data damaging programs such as viruses, trojan horses, etc. DATEV also offers secure e-mail communication with cascaded, centralized virus scanning and encrypted email.

A special characteristic is the reverse scan, where copies of all e-mails that were sent to the users within DATEVnet are constantly reviewed over twelve-hour periods in a central storage buffer, where they are continuously scanned for data infections. Viruses, trojans and keyloggers are quickly detected minimizing any data unwanted infection or manipulation.

To complete the protective belt a revers Web radar scan was also introduced into DATEVnet. The Web-radar is a multi-level security concept with both static and dynamic protection filters. Every web page accessed over the last 24 hours is reviewed to identify to origin of any infection or data corruption.

Strategic direction 
In early 2000, internal disputes arose amongst the cooperative members with regard to DATEV's offer of software directly to end clients i.e. non-professionals. Two movements formed within the co-operative. Those in favor of the provision of software services directly to end clients and those opposed to it, i.e. "the co-operative should do all it can to be economically successful" vs "the co-operative should only do things that bring benefits to its members". As a result, the pro-members formed the "IDA" (Association of DATEV Users). Tension mounted between the pro-IDA and existing members who claimed that the "economic success" of the co-operative was being placed in jeopardy.

The controversy resulted in the calling of an extraordinary members meeting on 18 February 2005. In the meeting, DATEV members voted to amend the existing co-operative statute by a majority of 86.5% and the approval and support of the IDA to allow for the provision of software directly to end clients. The provision of such direct services became known as "bound member client business" and requires the prior consent of the member consultant managing that end client before the direct services can be provided to them.

Internal co-operative tensions have also arisen as a result of the extension of the provision of existing services to the international domain i.e. initially with the Czech Republic (2000), then Austria (2001), Italy (2001) and Poland in 2003.

Despite the increasing tendency to reduce the use of "data center based" services, and to increase the use of "on-site" processing software, the DATEV co-operative has continued to increase its revenues and profits. This has benefited members who have received rebates on their fees. This provision of software directly to members for "on-site" processing has been available to members as a service since 2004 and has tended to reduce membership costs, particularly for smaller network installations.

Products 
The company now offers additional software to accountants and lawyers for their office. These professionals and their clients can use programs for payroll and for financial accounting, current account bookkeeping, cost accounting and business consulting. There are programs for processing and interpretation of all major types of taxes (corporation tax, income tax, GuE, consumption tax, trade tax, inheritance tax, SchSt). The tax database LexInform provides comprehensive information on the German tax law tax for consultants and business information. In addition, it offers to business management consulting services for organization and data processing.

Platforms 
DATEV assumes that customers are using Microsoft operating systems and application programs, or Microsoft Windows, Internet Explorer and Microsoft Office. Data storage has historically mostly been based on Microsoft SQL Server, and exclusively so since early 2006.

DATEV has recently begun to provide partial program interfaces to OpenOffice.org and StarOffice but is not the first manufacturer in the industry to do so. E-mail encryption to date has been limited to passing within Microsoft programs only. In 2017, OpenOffice support was discontinued due to insufficient demand.

The DATEV programs for payroll accounting also have approved interfaces to the ERP systems SAP Business One, SAP Business ByDesign and Microsoft Dynamics NAV.

Sponsorship 
DATEV is a sponsor of the Challenge Roth. The contract was extended, DATEV will be the title sponsor for another 3 years from 2022.

Subsidiaries 
 DATEV.at GmbH / Vienna, Austria
 DATEV.cz sro / Brno, Czech Republic
 DATEV.pl sp. z o.o. / Warsaw, Poland
 DATEV koinos. Sr.l. / Milan, Italy
 DATEV.it S.p.A. / Assago, Italy

Key data
 Turnover 2017: €978 million
 Members: 40.264 (June 30, 2018)
 Employees: 7.387 (June 30, 2018)

References

External links 
 
 DATEV
 DATEV International Site
 Sinfopac Internacional, S.L.U - DATEV Partner for Solutions

Information technology companies of Germany
Cooperatives in Germany